Isabella Theresa "Belle" Golding (25 November 1864 – 11 December 1940) was an Australian feminist, suffragist and labour activist.

Belle Golding was born at Tambaroora, Wellington County, New South Wales to Joseph Golding (died 1890), a gold-miner from Galway, Ireland, and his Scottish wife, Ann (died 1906; née Fraser). In May 1900, Belle Golding became the first female inspector of public schools in Australia. She and her sisters, Annie Mackenzie Golding (1855–1934), and Mrs Kate Dwyer, joined the Womanhood Suffrage League of New South Wales in about 1893, before forming the Women's Progressive Association in 1904.

Career
Under the Early Closing Act of 1899, Golding became Australia's first female inspector of public schools. Throughout her career as a public servant, Golding exercised her passion for improving the conditions of living for women, often documenting health and employment concerns unique to women. Later, when the Wage Arbitration Act passed, she was made an industrial inspector; the first and (as of 1940) the only woman to be named Chair of a Wage Board. In that position she was able to settle the dispute between the Fruiterers and Confectioners' Employees' Union. The dispute was settled in 7.5 hours, and the award ran its full term. Golding was a co-founder of the Society for the Prevention of Cruelty to Animals in Australia.

Death and legacy
After retiring due to ill health in 1927, Golding died, aged 76, on 11 December 1940 at Annandale, New South Wales.

Golding Place, in the Canberra suburb of Chisholm, is named for Golding and her sister Annie Mackenzie Golding.

References

External links
The Golding Sisters in The Encyclopedia of Women and Leadership in Twentieth-Century Australia

1940 deaths
1864 births
Australian suffragists
Australian people of Irish descent
Australian people of Scottish descent
People from New South Wales
19th-century Australian women
20th-century Australian women